Veer Babu Fateh Bahadur Shahi  was  Raja of Huseypur Raj which is situated in today's Gopalganj district of Bihar in India. 

He belonged to the Baghochia clan of Bhumihar Brahmins which controlled the Husseypur Estate, from which descended the Tamkuhi Raj of the Kushinagar district of Uttar Pradesh and the Hathwa Raj of Gopalganj district.

Rebellion against the British

Fateh Shahi with the rulers of Dileepnagar Estate waged a 20 year guerilla war against the British East India Company from 1767 onwards. He was swiftly deposed after this and fled into the forests with his followers where he waged a guerilla war against the Britishers.The rulers of Dileepnagar Estate helped Fateh Bahadur Sahi from backstage in guerilla war against the Britishers In 1772, he marched into Huseypur and killed Govind Ram who was appointed as the revenue farmer for the East India Company. In spite of this the company continued to try and bring Fateh Shahi into their fold as he held much influence among the zamindars however he refused all such offers. By 1775, the British had been experiencing many problems in the region and taking advantage of this, Fateh Shahi once again marched into Huseypur and killed his cousin, Basant Sahi who had been placed as the ruler of Huseypur by the EIC. His repeated incursions had crippled revenue collection in the area and exposed the weakness of British control in the locality.

In 1777, after many successes, he marched on to the Company's Bairakh / military station, gained control of it and placed his own men in charge.

In response, the British destroyed his fort and they noted that he had caused even more problems for them than the Peshwas in Maharashtra. 

Following the rebellion of Chait Singh of Benares state in 1781 he renewed his campaign against the Britishers or in other words the East India Company.
The rebellion led by him along with others were eventually defeated and the Britishers reasserted their rule in Bihar after his forces were defeated in the battle.

Legacy
Fateh Shahi's rebellion against the East India Company was the first of many rebellions against the Britishers in Bihar and India and the soon after that was followed by the 1857 rebellion. The saga of his struggle and fight against East India Company is described in the poem Meer Jamal Vadh.

References

18th-century Indian people
History of Bihar

People from Gopalganj district, India